The following lists events that happened during  1953 in New Zealand.

Population
 Estimated population as of 31 December: 2,074,700
 Increase since 31 December 1952: 50,100 (2.47%)
 Males per 100 females: 101.1

Incumbents

Regal and viceregal
Head of State – Elizabeth II, Queen of New Zealand, from 6 February 1952
Governor-General – Lieutenant-General The Lord Norrie GCMG GCVO CB DSO MC, from 1952-1957

Government
The 30th New Zealand Parliament continued. The National Party was in its second term in office under Sidney Holland.

Speaker of the House – Matthew Oram from 1950 to 1957
Prime Minister – Sidney Holland from 13 December 1949 to 20 September 1957.
Deputy Prime Minister – Keith Holyoake from 13 December 1949 to 20 September 1957.
Minister of Finance – Sidney Holland
Minister of Foreign Affairs – Clifton Webb from 19 September 1951 to 26 November 1954
Chief Justice — Sir Humphrey O'Leary (until 16 October), Sir Harold Barrowclough (from 17 November)

Parliamentary opposition 
 Leader of the Opposition –   Walter Nash (Labour).

Main centre leaders
Mayor of Auckland – John Luxford from 1953–1956
Mayor of Hamilton – Harold David Caro (from 1938 until his defeat in November) then Roderick Braithwaite (until 1959)
Mayor of Wellington – Robert Macalister from 1950–1956
Mayor of Christchurch – Robert M. Macfarlane from 1938–1941 and again from 1950–1958
Mayor of Dunedin – Leonard Morton Wright from 1950–1959

Events 
 6 January: Godfrey Bowen sets a world sheep shearing record, shearing 456 sheep in nine hours.
 10 January: The Social Credit Political League is formed from the earlier Social Credit Association.
29 May – Edmund Hillary and Tenzing Norgay reach the summit of Mount Everest, the first known time this has been done. Hillary is knighted the following day.
 2 June – Elizabeth II crowned as Queen of New Zealand at Westminster Abbey in London
 23 December – The newly crowned Elizabeth II arrives in New Zealand for a royal tour scheduled to last until 30 January 1954. It is estimated that three in four New Zealanders would make an effort to see her during the tour.
 24 December – Tangiwai disaster: A railway bridge collapses at Tangiwai in the central North Island, sending a fully loaded passenger train into the Whangaehu River, killing 151 passengers on board. The disaster remains New Zealand's worst rail accident.

Arts and literature

See 1953 in art, 1953 in literature, :Category:1953 books

Radio

See: Public broadcasting in New Zealand

Film

See: :Category:1953 film awards, 1953 in film, List of New Zealand feature films, Cinema of New Zealand, :Category:1953 films

Sport

Athletics
 Arthur Lydiard wins his first national title in the men's marathon, clocking 2:41:29.8 in Dunedin.

Chess
 The 60th National Chess Championship was held in Timaru, and was won by Ortvin Sarapu of Auckland (his second title).

Horse racing

Harness racing
 New Zealand Trotting Cup – Adorian
 Auckland Trotting Cup – Thelma Globe

Lawn bowls
The national outdoor lawn bowls championships are held in Auckland.
 Men's singles champion – R. McMaster (Stanley Bowling Club)
 Men's pair champions – J.F. Benson, Richard Pilkington (skip) (Balmoral Bowling Club)
 Men's fours champions – W.G. Thornally, C.B. Shine, N.A. Fletcher, N. Orange (skip) (Balmoral Bowling Club)

Shooting
 Ballinger Belt – Maurie Gordon (Okawa)

Soccer
 The Chatham Cup is won by Eastern Suburbs (of Auckland) who beat Northern (of Dunedin) 4–3 in the final.
 Provincial league champions:
	Auckland:	Eastern Suburbs AFC
	Bay of Plenty:	Mangakino Utd
	Canterbury:	Western
	Hawke's Bay:	Hastings Wanderers
	Manawatu:	Palmerston North United
	Nelson:	Woodbourne
	Northland:	Otangarei United
	Otago:	Northern AFC
	Poverty Bay:	Eastern Union
	South Canterbury:	Northern Hearts
	Southland:	Brigadiers, Thistle (shared)
	Taranaki:	City
	Waikato:	Huntly Thistle
	Wairarapa:	Carterton
	Wanganui:	New Settlers
	Wellington:	Wellington Marist

Births
 3 February: Steve Maharey, politician.
 5 February: Deborah Coddington, journalist and politician.
 17 February: Steve Millen, motor racing driver.
 23 March: Denis Aberhart, cricket player and coach.
 25 March: Paul Ballinger, long-distance runner
 25 May: John Z. Robinson, artist, printmaker and jewelmaker.
 14 June: Janet Mackey, politician.
 22 June: Phil Goff, politician.
 5 September: Murray Mexted, rugby player and commentator.
 7 September: Marc Hunter, musician.
 9 September: Edmond ("Sonny") Schmidt, bodybuilder.
 12 September: Ramesh Patel, field hockey player.
 6 November: Brian McKechnie, rugby player and cricketer.
 19 December: Paul McEwan, cricketer.
 Jonathan Dennis, film historian.
 Bill Ralston, journalist

Deaths
 20 January: Benjamin Robbins  MLC; Mayor of Hawera, Tauranga (born 1857) 
 29 July: Richard Pearse airplane pioneer (born 1877).
 16 October: Humphrey O'Leary, 7th Chief Justice of New Zealand.

See also
List of years in New Zealand
Timeline of New Zealand history
History of New Zealand
Military history of New Zealand
Timeline of the New Zealand environment
Timeline of New Zealand's links with Antarctica

References

External links

 
Years of the 20th century in New Zealand